Actinoplanes atraurantiacus is a Gram-positive bacterium from the genus Actinoplanes which has been isolated from forest soil in Yunnan, China.

References

External links 
Type strain of Actinoplanes atraurantiacus at BacDive -  the Bacterial Diversity Metadatabase

Micromonosporaceae
Bacteria described in 2012